Soltanabad (also Romanized as Solţānābād; also known as Ḩoseynābād and Sultānābād) is a village in Vakilabad Rural District, in the Central District of Arzuiyeh County, Kerman Province, Iran. At the 2006 census, its population was 2,067, in 468 families.

References 

Populated places in Arzuiyeh County